Arvelius is a genus of stink bugs in the family Pentatomidae. There are about 13 described species in Arvelius.

Species
These 13 species belong to the genus Arvelius:

 Arvelius acutispinus Breddin, 1909
 Arvelius albopunctatus (De Geer, 1773) (tomato stink bug)
 Arvelius caballeroi Brailovsky
 Arvelius confusus Brailovsky
 Arvelius ecuadorensis Brailovsky
 Arvelius haitiana Brailovsky
 Arvelius intermediata Brailovsky
 Arvelius latus Breddin, 1909
 Arvelius longirostris Brailovsky, 1981
 Arvelius nigroantennatus Brailovsky
 Arvelius paralongirostris Brailovsky
 Arvelius peruana Brailovsky
 Arvelius porrectispinus Breddin, 1909

References

Further reading

 
 

Pentatomidae genera
Articles created by Qbugbot
Pentatomini